Events from the year 1755 in Ireland.

Incumbent
Monarch: George II

Events
10 April – Essex Bridge across the river Liffey in Dublin is opened to carriage traffic.
1 November – the Spanish Arch in Galway is partially destroyed by a tsunami generated by the Lisbon earthquake which is felt across Munster.
The Commissioners of Inland Navigation order commencement of work on making the River Shannon navigable.
The Artillery Company of Ireland, predecessor of the Royal Irish Artillery, is formed.
Completion of Russborough House, County Wicklow, designed in the Palladian style by Richard Cassels for Joseph Leeson, 1st Earl of Milltown.
Kilwarlin Moravian Church is founded in County Down by the evangelist John Cennick.

Births
14 May – George Barrington, pickpocket, socialite, Australian pioneer and author (died 1804 in Australia)
7 June – Isidore Lynch, soldier (died 1841)
24 June – John Glendy, Presbyterian minister (died 1832 in the United States)
8 July – James Blackwood, 2nd Baron Dufferin and Claneboye, politician (died 1836)
John Handcock, soldier and politician (died 1786)
John Proby Osborne, lawyer and politician (died 1787)
Owen Wynne, landowner and politician (died 1841)
Approximate date
Joseph Allison, farmer and politician in Nova Scotia (died 1806)
Joseph Marshall, farmer, judge and politician in Nova Scotia (died 1847)

Deaths
16 March – Edward Southwell, politician (born 1705)
25 September – Luke Gardiner, property developer and politician (born c.1690)
William Richardson, politician.

References

 
Years of the 18th century in Ireland
Ireland
1750s in Ireland